Bolitho Park is a football stadium in Plymouth, England, which is the home of Plymouth Parkway, of The . It currently has a capacity of 3,500, 250 seated.

For the 2021–22 season, it was also the home of Truro City, of The .

The site shares an entrance point with the Manadon Sports Hub, home of Plymouth Argyle L.F.C.

History
Plymouth Parkway moved into the purpose built site in August 2003.

In 2021, with Truro City moving in while they wait for the Stadium for Cornwall to be developed, Bolitho Park underwent renovations to meet stadium grade requirements, bringing the ground's capacity up from 2,500 to 3,500, larger than Truro's Treyew Road was.

References

Sports venues in Plymouth, Devon
Football venues in England
Truro City F.C.